Amlash (also Romanized as Amlesh; also known as Amlish) is a city & capital of Amlash County, Gilan Province, Iran.  At the 2006 census, its population was 15,047, in 4,350 families.  Amlash sits at an altitude of 13 metres (45 feet).

References

Populated places in Amlash County

Cities in Gilan Province